Zierker See is a lake in the Mecklenburg Lake District, in Germany. It is situated in the district of Mecklenburgische Seenplatte of the state of Mecklenburg-Vorpommern. The town of Neustrelitz lies at the northern end of the lake.

The lake is navigable from Neustrelitz to its southern end, where it meets the Kammer Canal, and navigation is administered as part of the Obere–Havel–Wasserstraße. The Kammer Canal links the Zierker See to the Woblitzsee, allowing vessels to reach the River Havel, which flows through the Woblitzsee.

References

External links 
 

Lakes of Mecklenburg-Western Pomerania
Federal waterways in Germany